In mathematics the symmetrization methods are algorithms of transforming a set  to a ball  with equal volume  and centered at the origin. B is called the symmetrized version of A, usually denoted . These algorithms show up in solving the classical isoperimetric inequality problem, which asks: Given all two-dimensional shapes of a given area, which of them has the minimal perimeter (for details see Isoperimetric inequality). The conjectured answer was the disk and Steiner in 1838 showed this to be true using the Steiner symmetrization method (described below). From this many other isoperimetric problems sprung and other symmetrization algorithms. For example, Rayleigh's conjecture is that the first eigenvalue of the Dirichlet problem is minimized for the ball (see Rayleigh–Faber–Krahn inequality for details).

Symmetrization
If  is measurable, then it is denoted by  the symmetrized version of  i.e. a ball  such that .

Steiner symmetrization

Steiner symmetrization was introduced by Steiner (1838) to solve the isoperimetric theorem stated above. Let  be a hyperplane through the origin. For each  let the perpendicular line through  be . Then by replacing each  by a line centered at H and with length  we obtain the Steiner symmetrized version.

It is denoted by  the Steiner symmetrization wrt to  hyperplane of nonnegative measurable function  and for fixed  define it as

Properties 

 It preserves convexity: if  is convex, then  is also convex.
It is linear: .
Super-additive: .

Circular symmetrization

A popular method for symmetrization in the plane is Polya's circular symmetrization. After, its generalization will be described to higher dimensions. Let  be a domain; then its circular symmetrization  with regard to the positive real axis is defined as follows: Let

So it is defined 
 If  is the full circle, then . 
  iff .

 
Also, for the first coordinate let  if . So as above
 If  is the full cap, then .
In words,  is a cap symmetric around the positive axis  with the same area as the intersection .
  iff .

Polarization

Let  be a domain and  be a hyperplane through the origin.

  If , then .
 If , then .
 If , then .

In words,  is simply reflected to the halfspace . It turns out that this transformation can approximate the above ones (in the Hausdorff distance) (see ).

References

Geometric inequalities
Geometric algorithms